Renishaw may refer to:

Renishaw plc - a British engineering company
Renishaw, Derbyshire - a village in Derbyshire, England
Renishaw Hall -  a stately home in the above village.